John Villet (born 8 September 1973) is a South African cricketer. He played in nine first-class and six List A matches for Boland in 1994/95 and 1995/96.

See also
 List of Boland representative cricketers

References

External links
 

1973 births
Living people
South African cricketers
Boland cricketers
Cricketers from Bellville, South Africa